Brezovo is a town in Southern Bulgaria. It is located in Plovdiv oblast and is close to the town of Rakovski.

Populated places 
The following towns and villages are located inside the territory of Brezovo municipality:

 Babek
 Borets
 Brezovo
 Chehlare
 Choba
 Drangovo
 Otets Kirilovo
 Padarsko
 Rozovec
 Svezhen
 Streltsi
 Sarnegor
 Tyurkmen
 Varben
 Zelenikovo
 Zlatosel

Towns in Bulgaria
Populated places in Plovdiv Province